is a former Japanese football player.

Club statistics

References

External links

1990 births
Living people
Association football people from Shizuoka Prefecture
Japanese footballers
J1 League players
J2 League players
J3 League players
Japan Football League players
Nagoya Grampus players
Thespakusatsu Gunma players
FC Ryukyu players
Fujieda MYFC players
Association football defenders